The DR Congo national badminton team represents DR Congo in international team competitions. The national team is controlled by the Federation de Badminton du Congo (Lingala: Badminton Shirikisho la Jamhuriyya Kidemokrasia ya Kongo; FECOBAD). The national team trains in Kinshasa. The Democratic Republic of Congo debuted in the African Badminton Championships mixed team event in 2019. The team were eliminated in the group stage. 

The Democratic Republic of Congo team competed in an international team tournament for the first time in the 2019 African Badminton Championships. The team were placed in Group A with Algeria and Uganda. The team lost to both opposing teams in the group tie with a 5-0 score.

Participation in BCA competitions 

Mixed team

Participation in Africa Games 
The Democratic Republic of Congo mixed team made their first appearance in a team tournament at the African Games in 2011.  The team were eliminated in the group stages.

Current squad 

Male players
Dimand Ja Okito
Mutombo Tshizanga
Zola Wapi

Female players
Mbuyi Bernice Bokotsha
Bukasa Kaboko
Katambua Odia

References 

Badminton
National badminton teams
Badminton in the Democratic Republic of the Congo